Patrik Hasler (born 13 July 1965) is a Swiss snowboarder. He competed in the men's halfpipe event at the 1998 Winter Olympics.

References

1965 births
Living people
Swiss male snowboarders
Olympic snowboarders of Switzerland
Snowboarders at the 1998 Winter Olympics
Place of birth missing (living people)